Șieu-Măgheruș is a commune in Bistrița-Năsăud County, Transylvania, Romania. It is composed of seven villages: Arcalia (Árokalja), Chintelnic (Kentelke), Crainimăt (Királynémeti), Podirei (Pogyerej), Sărățel (Szeretfalva), Șieu-Măgheruș, and Valea Măgherușului (Sajómagyarósi völgy).

The commune lies on the Transylvanian Plateau, on the banks of the river Șieu.

Natives
  (1911–1992), cleric
 Teofil Herineanu (1909–1992), cleric

References

Communes in Bistrița-Năsăud County
Localities in Transylvania